Naga is an umbrella term for several indigenous communities in Northeast India and Upper Burma. The word Naga originated as an exonym. Today, it covers a number of ethnic groups that reside in the Indian states of Nagaland, Manipur, Assam and Arunachal Pradesh and also in Myanmar.

Before the arrival of the British, the term "Naga" was used in Assam to refer to certain isolated ethnic groups. The British adopted this term for a number of ethnic groups in the surrounding area, based on loose linguistic and cultural associations. 
Nagaland became the 16th state 
on 1 December 1965.
S. R. Tohring (2010) lists 66 Naga ethnic groups whereas Kibangwar Jamir (2016) lists 67 ethnic groups. The 1991 Census of India listed 35 Naga groups as Scheduled Tribes: 17 in Nagaland, 15 in Manipur and 3 in Arunachal Pradesh.

List of Naga ethnic groups

Naga ethnic groups with limited recognition

Composite ethnic groups or communities

Pakan 
Anāl, Maring, Lamkang, Moyon, Monsang, Khoibu

Tangshang 
A combination term, Tang from Tangnyu Vang (Wang) and Shang from Shangnyu Vang (Wang) chieftains, which were formerly known as and includes Heimi (Haimi), Pangmi, Rangpang, Tangsa, Wancho, Nocte, and Tutsa now.

Tenyimi 
Angami, Chakhesang, Mao, Maram, Inpui, Pochury, Poumai, Rengma, Thangal, Zeliang.

 Angami:  Chakhro Angami, Northern Angami, Southern Angami, Western Angami

 Chakhesang: 
Chokri, Khezha and formerly Pochury (Southern Sangtam) combined

 Shepfomei or Shepoumai (Mao–Poumai): 
Ememei, Lepaona, Chiliivai and Paomata together

 Zeliangrong: 
Zeme, Liangmai and Rongmei together

References 

Naga-related lists
 Tribes
Tribes